This is a list of Marathi (Indian Marathi-language) films that were released in 2020.

January - December

References 

2020
2020 in Indian cinema
 
Marathi